Jack Hanna's Animal Adventures is a nature documentary video/television series that ran in first-run syndication from 1993 to 2008, and remains in active distribution. The series was hosted by Jack Hanna, Director Emeritus of the Columbus Zoo and Aquarium. It is shown daily and weekly in syndication worldwide on numerous stations and networks, especially in the United States.

It is particularly popular in part because of Hanna's mainstream name recognition as an animal expert, but also because the show meets programming criteria for the U.S.'s federally mandated educational and informational requirements which all stations must follow. Because of this, the program is available for syndication up to five days per week, thus covering all but a half hour of the three-hour E/I mandate.

External links 

1993 American television series debuts
2008 American television series endings
1990s American children's television series
2000s American children's television series
1990s American documentary television series
2000s American documentary television series
American children's education television series
Litton Entertainment
Nature educational television series
Television series about mammals
English-language television shows
First-run syndicated television programs in the United States